Bagh-e Sangak  is a village in Khwahan Badakhshan Province in north-eastern Afghanistan.

References

Populated places in Khwahan District